Spectacle Pond is a  pond in the Pharaoh Lake Wilderness Area of New York State. A  trail leads to the south shore of Spectacle Pond from Spectacle Pond Trailhead located off of Adirondack Road in Schroon, NY.  Pharaoh Mountain can be clearly viewed to the east of the lake.

The waterbody contains brown bullhead and brown trout.

References

Protected areas of Essex County, New York